This is a comparison of regular expression engines.

Libraries

Languages

Language features
NOTE: An application using a library for regular expression support does not necessarily offer the full set of features of the library, e.g. GNU grep which uses PCRE does not offer lookahead support, though PCRE does.

Part 1

Part 2

API features

See also
 
 Comparison of parser generators

References

External links
 Regular Expression Flavor Comparison — Detailed comparison of the most popular regular expression flavors
 Regexp Syntax Summary
 Online Regular Expression Testing — with support for Java, JavaScript, .Net, PHP, Python and Ruby
 Implementing Regular Expressions — series of articles by Russ Cox, author of RE2
 Regular Expression Engines

Pattern matching
Regular expression engines
Regular expressions